Colt Technology Services Group Limited (formerly COLT Telecom Group S.A.) is a multinational telecommunications company headquartered in London, United Kingdom. It was listed on the London Stock Exchange and was a constituent of the FTSE 250 Index until it was acquired by Fidelity Investments in August 2015. "Colt" stood for City Of London Telecom.

History
Colt was founded in 1992 by Jim Hynes with funds provided by Fidelity Investments as City Of London Telecommunications. The company began to construct a telecoms network in London. In 1993 it was awarded a licence to compete with British Telecom and Cable and Wireless in voice and data transmission. It was first listed on the London Stock Exchange in 1996. The group later expanded into Europe, building networks in major European cities over the next 10 years.

In 2001 Fidelity helped the Company to raise a further £400m to finance its future activities. In 2005 the company reached its first year of positive cash flow, and in 2007 its first year of profit. In April 2009 Colt completed an Open Offer raising €199.1m (including a €9.7m foreign exchange gain) before expenses with the issue of 211.0 million shares. In 2010 Colt rebranded from COLT Telecom to Colt Technology Services, deleting the acronym City of London Telecommunications to reflect its pan-European nature. In May 2011 Colt acquired a majority shareholding in MarketPrizm, a provider of low latency market data and trading infrastructure services.

In August 2012 Colt acquired a majority shareholding in ThinkGrid, a cloud platform for delivery of hosted services

On 12 November 2014, Colt acquired KVH, a Japanese Telecom service provider, helping Colt to expand its capability in the growing Asian market.

In August 2015 the company was acquired by Fidelity Investments.

On 2 November 2022, Colt entered into agreement to acquire Lumen Technologies' Europe, Middle East and Africa (EMEA) business for $1.8 billion.

Operations
Colt has offices in 22 European countries, the US, India and Asia, with the company's network reaching 51 metro areas globally. The parent company's main centre of operations is based in the United Kingdom. Colt is organised as follows:

Network Services

Colt network services are “focused particularly on selected network intensive market segments: capital markets, media, cloud service providers and fixed and mobile network operators”.

Voice Services

Colt sells voice services that support “transition from traditional to next-generation voice services with a particular focus on Enterprise Voice, including IN services and IP Voice opportunities”.

References

External links
 

Companies listed on the London Stock Exchange
Telecommunications companies established in 1992
ICT service providers
Telecommunications companies of Luxembourg
Telecommunications companies of the United Kingdom
Internet service providers of the United Kingdom
Multinational companies headquartered in the United Kingdom
1992 establishments in England
2015 mergers and acquisitions
Telecommunications companies disestablished in 2015
2015 disestablishments in England